In public transport, Route 3 may refer to:

Route 3 (MTA Maryland), a bus route in Baltimore, Maryland and its suburbs
Barcelona Metro line 3
London Buses route 3
Line 3 (Madrid Metro)
Melbourne tram route 3
3 (New York City Subway service)
Seoul Subway Line 3
Shanghai Metro Line 3
Southern Vectis route 3, a bus route running between Newport and Ryde on the Isle of Wight

3